Influenza A virus subtype H7 may refer to:

Influenza A virus subtype H7N1
Influenza A virus subtype H7N2
Influenza A virus subtype H7N3
Influenza A virus subtype H7N4
Influenza A virus subtype H7N7
Influenza A virus subtype H7N9